Manfred Wimmer ( 1944 – 1995) was the first Western professional Go player.

Manfred Wimmer was born in Austria in 1944. He won the European Go Championship in 1969 and 1974. He became a professional shodan in the Kansai Ki-In on January 26, 1978 (shortly before James Kerwin, the American who became the second Western Go professional on February 14, 1978, in the Nihon Kiin). Wimmer was promoted to the rank of 2p the same year (though gobase.org lists him as a 1p).

In 1991, he introduced the game of Go in Madagascar and, around the same time, reportedly in Kenya. Wimmer died of a stroke in Vienna in 1995 while playing Go at a cafe.

See also
 European Go Players
 European Go Federation

References

External links
Pok's "a kind of obituary" of Manfred Wimmer
Senseis Library page on Manfred Wimmer

1944 births
1995 deaths
Austrian Go players